The 2018–19 Austrian Cup was the 88th edition of the national cup in Austrian football. The champions of the cup earned a place in the 2019–20 Europa League and would have begun play in the Group stage. Sixty–four clubs participated in this season's cup competition. 

Sturm Graz were the defending champions after winning the competition in the previous season by defeating Red Bull Salzburg in the final. Times up to 27 October 2018 and from 31 March 2019 are CEST (UTC+2). Times from 28 October 2018 to 30 March 2019 are CET (UTC+1).

First round 
Thirty–two first round matches were played between 20 and 22 July 2018.

Second round 
Fifteen second round matches were played 25 September 2018.

Third round
The eight third round matches were played on 30 October 2018.

Quarter-finals 
The four quarter-finals matches were played from 15 to 17 February 2019.

Semi-finals

Final

See also 
 2018–19 Austrian Football Bundesliga

References

External links 

 soccerway.com

Austrian Cup seasons
Cup
Austrian Cup